United States Strategic Command (USSTRATCOM) is one of the eleven unified combatant commands in the United States Department of Defense. Headquartered at Offutt Air Force Base, Nebraska, USSTRATCOM is responsible for strategic nuclear deterrence, global strike, and operating the Defense Department's Global Information Grid. It also provides a host of capabilities to support the other combatant commands, including integrated missile defense; and global command, control, communications, computers, intelligence, surveillance, and reconnaissance (C4ISR). This command exists to give "national leadership a unified resource for greater understanding of specific threats around the world and the means to respond to those threats rapidly".

Mission statement
USSTRATCOM employs nuclear, cyber, global strike, joint electronic warfare, missile defense, and intelligence capabilities to deter aggression, decisively and accurately respond if deterrence fails, assure allies, shape adversary behavior, defeat terror, and define the force of the future.

Priorities
Strategic Deterrence
Decisive Response
A Combat-Ready Force

Commander's intent
Embrace strategic deterrence, consisting of innovative joint fighting forces integrated and synchronized in multiple domains to ensure national security.
Ensure a decisive response to aggression, against any threat, when called upon by civilian national leadership.
Anticipate and meet tactical, theater, and strategic demands through operational plans and capability development.
Develop the next generation of people and capabilities in order to prevail in future conflicts.

Headquarters organizational structure

J1 – Human Capital: Develops and administers command manpower and personnel policies, human resources, and personnel assignment programs.
J2 – Intelligence: Responsible for delivering all-source intelligence while enabling the execution of assigned strategic deterrence, space and cyberspace operations. Directs all intelligence-related support for the commander and ensures unity of intelligence effort across the Command.
J3 – Global Operations: Coordinates the planning, employment and operation of DoD strategic assets and combines all current operations, intelligence, and global command and control operations. Subdivisions within J3 include Combat and Information Operations, Current Operations, Logistics, and Joint Electromagnetic Spectrum Operations (JEMSO).
J4 – Logistics: The Logistics Directorate plans, coordinates and executes joint logistics functions, and provides capability-based readiness assessments and facilities management in support of U.S. Strategic Command's global mission.
J5 – Plans and Policy: Responsible for coordinating the development and implementation of national security policy as it applies to the command and the execution of its mission. Develops future plans, policy and strategy across all mission areas as outlined in the Unified Command Plan.
J6 – C4 Systems: Coordinates, facilitates, monitors and assesses systems, networks and communications requirements.
J7 – Joint Exercises, Training and Assessments: Manages the USSTRATCOM commander's Joint Exercises, Training, and Assessments programs in order to ensure readiness to perform the Command missions. Provides modeling and simulation support for exercises and training events to the Joint Chiefs of Staff (JCS), Combatant Commands, and other Major Commands (MAJCOM). Manages the Joint Lessons Learned Program. Augments the battle staff during a crisis.
J8 – Capability and Resource Integration: Conducts force management and analysis to include integrating, coordinating, prioritizing, and advocating USSTRATCOM future concepts, mission capability needs, weapons system development, support for emerging technologies, and command and control architecture across the mission areas. Responsible for all command requirement processes, and ensures appropriate decision support tools and assessment processes are in place to enhance operational capabilities.

Organizational structure

Component Commands

Command posts
The Global Operations Center, or GOC, is the nerve center for USSTRATCOM. The GOC is responsible for the global situational awareness of the commander, USSTRATCOM, and is the mechanism by which he exercises operational command and control of the Nation's global strategic forces.

The Alternate Processing and Correlation Center in the USSTRATCOM Underground Command Complex at Offutt AFB provides an alternate missile warning correlation center to the Cheyenne Mountain Missile Warning Center.  It is the prime source of missile warning data for USSTRATCOM for force survival and force management.  The facility consists of the integration of the SCIS, CSSR, and CCPDS-R systems and also upgrade equipment and communications links.

U.S. Strategic Command's Airborne Command Post (ABNCP), also called "Looking Glass", allows USSTRATCOM the ability to command, control, and communicate with its nuclear forces should ground-based command centers become inoperable.

History
USSTRATCOM was originally formed in 1992, as a successor to Strategic Air Command in response to the end of the Cold War and a new vision of nuclear warfare in U.S. defense policy. Department of Defense changes in command structure due to the "Goldwater-Nichols Act" of 1986, led to a single command responsible for all strategic nuclear weapons. As a result, USSTRATCOM's principal mission was to deter military attack, and if deterrence failed, to counter with nuclear weapons.

Throughout its history, it has drawn from important contributions from many different organizations stretching back to World War II. Providing national leadership with a single command responsible for all strategic nuclear forces, General George Butler, in establishing the new command, borrowed from the work of General Curtis LeMay, an early commander of Strategic Air Command. LeMay was a very vocal advocate for a strong national defense, particularly as regards nuclear weapons.

Being a Unified Command, another major concern for Gen. Butler was interservice rivalry, having soldiers, sailors, airmen and marines in one command. There had been decades of rivalry between the branches of the U.S. military regarding control of nuclear weapons. Even though a compromise had established the Joint Strategic Target Planning Staff, there were systemic and institutional problems that could not be overcome.

USSTRATCOM was re-structured 1 October 2002 by Secretary of Defense Donald Rumsfeld. It was now to merge with the United States Space Command and assume all duties for full-spectrum global strike, operational space support, integrated missile defense, and global Command, Control, Communications, Computers, Intelligence, Surveillance and Reconnaissance (C4ISR) and specialized planning. Its duties now include intelligence and cyber support as well as monitoring orbiting satellites and space debris.

In February 2008, USSTRATCOM succeeded in destroying a satellite, USA193, about to re-enter the earth's atmosphere.

USSTRATCOM also supported United States Africa Command's 2011 military intervention in Libya in a variety of ways, including long-range conventional strikes and intelligence, surveillance and reconnaissance (ISR).

An intention by the U.S. Air Force to create a 'cyber command' was announced in October 2006. On 21 May 2010, part of USSTRATCOM's responsibility regarding cyber-warfare operations was spun off into a 10th Unified Command, the United States Cyber Command. As a result, USSTRATCOM's Joint Task Force-Global Network Operations (JTF-GNO) and Joint Functional Component Command – Network Warfare (JFCC-NW) were disestablished.

List of combatant commanders

See also
 Nuclear weapons and the United States

References

External links

 United States Strategic Command Official Website
 US Strategic Command Airborne Command Post Fact Sheet
 Air Force Magazine, Journal of the Air Force Assoc., August 2008.
 FAS: United States Space Command (USSPACECOM)
 GAO Report: Additional Actions Needed by U.S. Strategic Command to Strengthen Implementation of Its Many Missions and New Organization

 
Strategic Command
Military globalization
Military units and formations established in 1992
1992 establishments in the United States
Military units and formations in Nebraska
Organizations based in Omaha, Nebraska
United States nuclear command and control
Strategic forces